The United States has placed first overall in the Summer Olympic Games eighteen times, followed by the Soviet Union with six overall victories (not including the 1992 first-place finish by the Unified Team). In the Winter Olympic Games, Norway has placed first overall nine times and the Soviet Union (prior to its dissolution in 1991) had placed first seven times.

Summer Olympics

List by games

List by team

Winter Olympics

List by games

List by team

Notes

Sources

Official site
Database olympics

Teams By Medals Won